Frayser is a neighborhood on the northside of Memphis, Tennessee, United States. It is named after Memphis physician Dr. J Frayser, who owned a summer home near the railroad. Frayser's boundaries are the Wolf River to the south, the Mississippi River to the west, the Loosahatchie River to the north, and ICRR tracks to the east. The population of Frayser is 45,000.

History
The area was settled in the 1820s, when Italian settlers purchased farmland in northwestern Shelby County.

Annexation
On January 1, 1958, most of Frayser was annexed by the City of Memphis. In the mid-1960s, the north and west boundary of the area were also absorbed by Memphis.

Education
Most of the public schools in Frayser are served by Shelby County Schools (previously under the authority of the Memphis City Schools system). Elementary schools include, Hawkins Mill, Delano, Georgian Hills, and Lucie E Campbell Elementary Schools. Middle schools include, Grandview Heights and Georgian Hills Middle Schools. Frayser is also home to a public high school, Trezevant High School.

Private education 
With the state changes in the education process, the Achievement School District was created and a number of school agencies sprouted in the Frayser Community including charter schools and a Montessori school. In February 2012 the Achievement School District announced that it planned to take over management of Corning Elementary School, Frayser Elementary School, and Westside Middle school in Frayser.

Frayser is also home to Memphis Business Academy(MBA)'s middle and high school. MBA opened Memphis STEM Academy in August 2016.

Higher education 
Frayser is home to Southwest Tennessee Community College's Gill Campus. The Gill Campus is located in the northeast quadrant of the neighborhood.

Parks and recreation
Public parks in Frayser are serviced by the Memphis Parks Commission.

Public parks 

 Ed Rice Community Center, Frayser Park and Frayser Tennis Center
 North Frayser Community and Pickett Park
 Shilver Park
 Egypt-Central Park and Frayser-Raleigh Senior Center (currently located in Raleigh, but serves some parts of Frayser)
 Firestone Park
 Denver Park
 Grandview Park
 Davy Crockett Park
 Westside Park
 Rodney Baber Park

Recreation

Transportation
Frayser is served by 4 MATA bus routes, numbered 11, 32, 40, and 42. Central and northeast Frayser are also served by Ready! Zone 2. Ready! is a demand-responsive service that replaces the former route 6 bus.

Interstate I-40 runs through the southern reaches of Frayser. US 51/SR 3 bisects the western quadrants of the neighborhood. Frayser entirely encapsulates SR 300, which connects US 51 to I-40 exit 2A. Frayser also serves as the southern terminus of SR 388.

References

External links

 
 Frayser Community Association
 Frayser Community Development Corporation

neighborhoods in Memphis, Tennessee